Finger Paintings is the third studio album by Earl Klugh released in 1977.

Track listing
 "Dr. Macumba" (Earl Klugh) – 4:27
 "Long Ago and Far Away" (James Taylor) – 5:37
 "Cabo Frio" (Klugh) – 3:32
 "Keep Your Eye on the Sparrow" (Dave Grusin, Morgan Ames) – 4:37
Horns arranged by Tom Scott
 "Catherine" (Klugh) – 4:11
 "Dance with Me" (John Hall, Johanna Hall) – 3:26
 "Jolanta" (Klugh) – 3:03
 "Summer Song" (Klugh) – 4:07
 "This Time" (Klugh) – 3:44

Personnel

Musicians
 Earl Klugh – main performer and acoustic guitar
 Dave Grusin – arranger and conductor, Fender Rhodes, synthesizer, and percussion (on tracks 5 and 6)
 Lee Ritenour – electric guitar on tracks 1 to 3, 5, and 9
12-string guitar on tracks 8

 Anthony Jackson – electric bass on tracks 1 to 3, 5, and 9
 Louis Johnson – electric bass on tracks 4, 6, and 7
 Francisco Centeno – bass on track 8
 Harvey Mason – drums on tracks: 2, 3, 5, and 9
 Steve Gadd – drums on tracks: 1, 4, and 6 to 8
 Ralph MacDonald – percussion on tracks 1, 2, 7, and 9
 Steve Forman – percussion on tracks 3, 4, and 8

Additional Musicians
 Arnold Belnick, Pamela Goldsmith, Endre Granat, Allan Harshman, Karen Jones, Jacob Krachmalnick, Bernard Kundell, Edgar Lustgarten, David Montagu, Constance Pressman, Dana L. Rees, Sheldon Sanov, Marshall Sosson, Ann M. Stockton, and Gerald Vince – strings
 Chuck Findley, Dick Hyde, Jack Nimitz, Jerome Richardson, Tom Scott, Lawrence Williams – horns
 Alexandra Brown, Lisa Roberts, Stephanie Spruill – backing vocals on track 4

Production
 George Butler – executive producer
 Dave Grusin and Larry Rosen – producers
 John Golden – mastering
 Larry Rosen – recorded and mixing
 Phil Schier – strings and horn recording
 Michael Ebert and Michael Shulman – studio (recording and mixing) assistants

Charts Positions

References

External links

1977 albums
Earl Klugh albums
Blue Note Records albums
Albums recorded at CBS 30th Street Studio
Albums recorded at Electric Lady Studios